The 1997 Bowling Green Falcons football team was an American football team that represented Bowling Green University in the Mid-American Conference (MAC) during the 1997 NCAA Division I-A football season. In their seventh season under head coach Gary Blackney, the Falcons compiled a 3–8 record (3–5 against MAC opponents), finished in a tie for fourth place in the MAC East Division, and were outscored by all opponents by a combined total of 341 to 191.

The team's statistical leaders included Bob Niemet with 1,723 passing yards, Robbie Hollis with 492 rushing yards, and Damron Hamilton with 777 receiving yards.

Schedule

References

Bowling Green
Bowling Green Falcons football seasons
Bowling Green Falcons football